CHFX-FM is a Canadian radio station broadcasting at 101.9 FM in Halifax, Nova Scotia. The station currently plays a country format branded on-air as FX101.9. CHFX's studios are located at 90 Lovett Lake Court, while its transmitter is located on Washmill Lake Drive in Clayton Park. The station is owned and operated by the Maritime Broadcasting System, which also owns sister station CHNS-FM. The station has been on the air since November 1947.

Current hosts
 Frankie Hollywood & MJ (FX Mornings) 
 Bob Kingsley's Country Top 40

References

External links
 
 
 

Hfx
Hfx
Hfx
Radio stations established in 1947
1947 establishments in Nova Scotia